The Koko Crater Botanical Garden (60 acres) is a botanical garden located within the Koko Crater (Koko Head) on the eastern end of Oahu, Hawaii. It was given the dual title of the Charles M. Wills Cactus Garden by the Honolulu Department of Parks and Recreation, in recognition of his contributions to the garden, in 1966.

The garden is part of the Honolulu Botanical Gardens, and first established in 1958. Its hot, dry climate is suitable for Plumeria and Bougainvillea cultivars in the outer crater, kiawe (Prosopis pallida) and koa haole (Leucaena leucocephala) trees, and four major collections organized by region (Africa, the Americas, Hawaii, and Pacifica). Other collections include adeniums, alluaudias, aloes, baobabs, cacti, euphorbias, palms, and sansevierias, as well as a native grove of wiliwili trees (Erythrina sandwicensis). A loop trail (2 miles) runs through the collections. They have about 500 trees and 200 species of trees.

See also 
 List of botanical gardens in the United States

External links 

 Koko Crater Botanical Garden

Honolulu Botanical Gardens
Protected areas of Oahu
Protected areas established in 1958
1958 establishments in Hawaii